The Oper Frankfurt (Frankfurt Opera) is a German opera company based in Frankfurt.  

Opera in Frankfurt am Main has a long tradition, with many world premieres such as Franz Shrek's Der ferne Klang in 1912, Fennimore und Gerda by Frederick Delius in 1919, and Carl Orff's Carmina Burana in 1937. Frankfurt's international recognition began in the Gielen Era, 1977 to 1987, when Michael Gielen and stage directors such as Ruth Berghaus collaborated.

A historic opera house from 1880 was destroyed in World War II, and reconstructed as a concert hall, the Alte Oper. The present opera house, built in 1963, is under one roof with the stage for drama. The opera orchestra is called  Frankfurter Opern- und Museumsorchester. Today's venue for Baroque and contemporary opera is the Bockenheimer Depot, a former tram depot.

Voted best 'Opera house of the year' by Opernwelt several times since 1996, including 2020, Oper Frankfurt is part of the Städtische Bühnen Frankfurt.

History
Frankfurt's first opera was Johann Theile's Adam und Eva, performed in 1698 by Johann Velten's touring company. The young Goethe's first operas in his home town of Frankfurt were productions by Theobald Marchand's company.

1782 – 1880
Opened in 1782, the Comoedienhaus was the first permanent venue of the Frankfurt Theater (drama and opera). In 1878 German violinist Willy Hess took up the leadership of the Oper Frankfurt. He resigned from that post in 1886 to take up a professorship in the Rotterdam Conservatorium voor Muziek.

1880 – 1944
The first representative opera house of the city was inaugurated in Frankfurt in 1880 at Opernplatz. Under the direction of the first Intendant  and the first Kapellmeister Felix Otto Dessoff, the house was opened with Mozart's opera Don Giovanni.

During the 1920s, the opera in Frankfurt had more prominent Jewish singers than any other company in Germany, including the tenor Hermann Schramm, bass Hans Erl (the first King in Schreker's Der Schatzgräber), baritone Richard Breitenfeld and contralto Magda Spiegel, who also toured with Frankfurt Opera performing Wagner in the Netherlands. These singers were forced to leave the opera in June 1933. Orff's Carmina Burana was premiered at Oper Frankfurt in 1937. Jewish members of the opera company among those rounded up at 9 November 1938 at the Festhalle Frankfurt, where Erl sang In diesen Heilgen Hallen, from the Magic Flute for the deportees. Members of Frankfurt Opera were sent to Auschwitz and other camps where they perished.

1945 – 1970s

The opera house was damaged in an air raid in January 1944, and then almost completely destroyed in March. A new house for opera and play was built, completed in 1963 at the Theaterplatz (now Willy-Brandt-Platz). In 1952, Georg Solti became Generalmusikdirektor (GMD) and Intendant of the Oper Frankfurt, where he remained in charge for nine years.

The Gielen Era
From 1977 to 1987, Frankfurt Opera was led by Michael Gielen. This decade became known as the "Gielen Era", notable for the music of a conductor who was also a composer, and directors including Ruth Berghaus and Hans Neuenfels, whose productions of standard works such as Verdi's Aida and Wagner's Ring Cycle were thought-provoking. Operas which received their world premieres at the house were also performed again, including Franz Schreker's Die Gezeichneten.

1987 – present
The stage of the opera house was destroyed by a fire in November 1987. The opera house was rebuilt and opened in April 1991. Many famous singers started their career with the company, including  Franz Völker, Edda Moser, Cheryl Studer and Diana Damrau, and many established artists have been engaged there in recent seasons including Christian Gerhaher, whose roles here have included Monteverdi's L'Orfeo and his first Wolfram in Wagner's Tannhäuser, Piotr Beczała in Massenet's Werther and Jan-Hendrik Rootering in Wagner's Parsifal.

Since 2002, Bernd Loebe has served as Intendant of the company.  The company's current GMD is Sebastian Weigle, since 2008.  Weigle has made commercial recordings of opera with the company for the OEHMS Classics label.  He is scheduled to stand down as GMD of Oper Frankfurt at the close of the 2022–2023 season.  In October 2021, the company announced the appointment of Thomas Guggeis as the next GMD of the company, effective with the 2023–2024 season, with an initial contract of 5 years.

Oper Frankfurt was voted 1996, 2003, 2015, 2018 and 2020 "Opera House of the Year" by the magazine Opernwelt.

Städtische Bühnen
Oper Frankfurt (Frankfurt Opera) and Schauspiel Frankfurt (Theatre Frankfurt) are part of the Städtische Bühnen Frankfurt am Main GmbH.

Artistic leadership
The first conductors had the title Kapellmeister. From 1924 it was GMD, who often also held the administrative leadership Intendant (Int.).

 Felix Otto Dessoff (1880–1892, Kapellmeister)
 Ludwig Rottenberg (1893–1924, Kapellmeister)
 Clemens Krauss (1924–1929, GMD)
 Hans Wilhelm Steinberg (1929–1933)
 Bertil Wetzelsberger (1933–1934)
 Karl Maria Zwißler (1935–1936)
 Georg Ludwig Jochum (1937–1938)
 Franz Konwitschny (1938–1944, GMD)
 Bruno Vondenhoff (1945–1951, GMD)
 Georg Solti (1952–1961, GMD & Int.)
 Lovro von Matačić (1961–1966, GMD & Int.)
 Christoph von Dohnányi (1967–1977, GMD & Int.)
 Michael Gielen (1977–1987, GMD & Int.)
 Gary Bertini (1987–1991, GMD)
 Sylvain Cambreling (1993–1997, GMD)
 Martin Steinhoff (1997–2002, Int.)
 Paolo Carignani (1999–2008, GMD)
 Bernd Loebe (2002–present, Int.)
 Sebastian Weigle (2008–present, GMD)
 Thomas Guggeis (designated, from 2023)

Premieres 
World premieres at the Frankfurt Opera have included:

References

External links 
  
 Städtische Bühnen Frankfurt am Main GmbH 
 Theatre Frankfurt
 New construction of an opera house: 
 The Forsythe Company

German opera companies
Opera houses in Germany
Buildings and structures in Frankfurt
Culture in Frankfurt
Tourist attractions in Frankfurt
Frankfurt-Altstadt